Sawadaea is a genus of fungi in the family Erysiphaceae (powdery mildews). The widespread genus contains nine species. One more species was added in 2011.

The genus was circumscribed by Kingo Miyabe in J. Fac. Agric. Hokkaido Imp. Univ. vol.38 (3) on pages 286, 371, 374 and 449 in 1937.

The genus name of Sawadaea is in honour of Kaneyoshi (Kenkichi) Sawada (1888–1950), who was a Japanese botanist and mycologist. He worked at the College of Agriculture in the National Taiwan University.

Species
As accepted by Species Fungorum;
Sawadaea aesculi 
Sawadaea bicornis 
Sawadaea bifida 
Sawadaea bomiensis 
Sawadaea koelreuteriae 
Sawadaea kovaliana 
Sawadaea nankinensis 
Sawadaea polyfida 
Sawadaea tulasnei 
Sawadaea zhengii 

Former species;
Sawadaea aceris  = Sawadaea bicornis
Sawadaea negundinis  = Sawadaea bicornis
Sawadaea polyfida var. japonica  = Sawadaea polyfida

References 

Erysiphales
Fungal plant pathogens and diseases